Arkadiusz Godel (born 4 February 1952) is a Polish former fencer. He won a gold medal in the team foil event at the 1972 Summer Olympics.

References

1952 births
Living people
Polish male fencers
Olympic fencers of Poland
Fencers at the 1972 Summer Olympics
Fencers at the 1976 Summer Olympics
Olympic gold medalists for Poland
Olympic medalists in fencing
Sportspeople from Lublin
University of Warsaw alumni
Medalists at the 1972 Summer Olympics
20th-century Polish people
21st-century Polish people